Trewennack is a village northeast of Helston in Cornwall, England, United Kingdom. It is on the A394 main road.

The name of the village comes from the Cornish language words tre, meaning 'farm' or 'settlement', and Gwedhenek, a personal name.

References

Villages in Cornwall